TPF may refer to:
 Tibial plateau fracture
 Theodore Payne Foundation for Wild Flowers and Native Plants
 Transaction Processing Facility, an operating system by IBM
 Terrestrial Planet Finder, a proposed system of telescopes to detect extrasolar planets
 The Pop Factory, a Welsh television program
 The Perl Foundation, a non-profit organization
 The Proud Family, a Disney Channel Original Series
 Tapered-polymer-fiber, a type of laser
 Docetaxel, Cisplatin, and fluorouracil, a chemotherapy regimen used in head and neck cancer
 Tokyopop, a manga publishing company
 Telangana Praja Front, a political party
 Transports publics Fribourgeois, a public transport operator in the Swiss canton of Fribourg
 Tribunal pénal fédéral, the Swiss Supreme Court for criminal matters
 Peter O. Knight Airport, IATA airport code
 Tooting Popular Front, a fictional revolutionary organisation in Citizen Smith
 The Purse Forum, a popular online forum dedicated to the discussion of fashion and luxury goods
 National Treatment Purchase Fund, the Irish healthcare programme
 Tachi Palace Fights, an American Mixed Martial Arts promotion.
 Transport Fever, a computer game
 Tactical Patrol Force, slang term for riot control squad